Heitor TP is the first long play studio solo album by the Brazilian musician Heitor Pereira, released in 1987 (see 1987 in music).

Track listing
 Descaso
 Assim Vejo Muito Mais
 Sonho Blues...
 Futuro?
 Ballet
 Sua História
 Panô
 Cidade Nua
 Loura
 CTI

References

1987 debut albums
Heitor Pereira albums